Alec William Sokolow (born June 9, 1965) is an American screenwriter who has worked on such projects as the movies Cheaper by the Dozen, Toy Story, Money Talks, and Garfield: The Movie. He frequently works with writing partner Joel Cohen.

Along with director Joss Whedon, Andrew Stanton, John Lasseter, Pete Docter, Joe Ranft, and Cohen, Sokolow was nominated in 1995 for the Academy Award for Best Writing (Original Screenplay) for his work on Toy Story.

Beyond writing, Sokolow and Cohen jointly directed Monster Mash: The Movie (1995) and executive produced Gnomes and Trolls: The Secret Chamber (2008).

Selected writing credits

Movies 
NBA All-Star Stay in School Jam (1992)
Monster Mash: The Movie (1995)
Toy Story (1995)
Money Talks (1997)
Goodbye Lover (1998)
Cheaper by the Dozen (2003)
Garfield: The Movie (2004)
Garfield: A Tail of Two Kitties (2006)
Evan Almighty (2007)
Daddy Day Camp (2007)
Gnomes and Trolls: The Secret Chamber (2008)
The Last Godfather (2010)
Shooting an Elephant (2015)
I am Jane Doe (2017)
I Am Little Red (2017)
Magic Arch 3D (2020)
Norm of the North: Family Vacation (2020)
Rock Dog 2: Rock Around the Park (2021)

Video games 
Skylanders: Spyro's Adventure (2011)

References

External links 
 

Living people
Place of birth missing (living people)
American male screenwriters
Annie Award winners
1965 births